The Morichales de Paz de Ariporo is a proposed national park in Casanare Department of Colombia. It was formerly referred to as the Humedales de Casanare. The area holds the largest extension of wetlands in eastern Colombia.

The park has many stands of Moriche palm (Mauritia flexuosa) that exist throughout the wetlands.

See also
 Orinoquía Region, Colombia

References 

Protected areas of Colombia
Geography of Casanare Department